Jackson Township is a township in Taylor County, Iowa, USA.

History
Jackson Township is named for Andrew Jackson.

References

Townships in Taylor County, Iowa
Townships in Iowa